is a Japanese snowboarder who competed in the men's halfpipe at the 2018 Winter Olympics. He finished 7th overall.

References

1995 births
Living people
Japanese male snowboarders
Olympic snowboarders of Japan
Snowboarders at the 2018 Winter Olympics
21st-century Japanese people